Meykhvaran-e Sadat (also Romanized as Meykhvārān-e Sādāt, Meykhowrān-e Sādāt, and Meykhvorān-e Sādāt; also known as Meykhowrān-e Bālā) is a village in Bavaleh Rural District, in the Central District of Sonqor County, Kermanshah Province, Iran. At the 2006 census, its population was 28, in 7 families.

References 

Populated places in Sonqor County